Sulata Deo is an Indian politician and a member of the Rajya Sabha, upper house of the Parliament of India from Odisha as member of the Biju Janata Dal. She was previously advisor to the 'Mission Shakti' program of Govt of Odisha. She is also spokesperson of BJD.

References

Biju Janata Dal politicians
Living people
Year of birth missing (living people)
Rajya Sabha members from Odisha